The 2017 TCR International Series Buriram round was the eighth round of the 2017 TCR International Series season. It took place on 3 September at the Chang International Circuit.

Norbert Michelisz won the first race starting from third position and Aurélien Panis gained the second one, starting from pole position, both driving a Honda Civic Type-R TCR.

Ballast
Due to the results obtained in the previous round, Gianni Morbidelli received +30 kg, Daniel Lloyd +20 kg and Maťo Homola +10 kg. While Norbert Michelisz will take his +20 kg of ballast carried over from the Hungaroring round.

The Balance of Performance was also adjusted for this event, meaning the Audi RS3 LMS TCRs and Honda Civic Type-R TCRs was both given a -10 kg weight break.

Classification

Qualifying

Notes
 — Aurélien Panis and Davit Kajaia was both sent to the back of the grid for Race 1, after an engine change.
 — Dušan Borković was not allowed to start Q2, after having received external aid, after he broke the suspension on his car during Q1. Gianni Morbidelli who had qualified 13th in Q1, was allowed to take his place in Q2.
 — Douglas Khoo was sent to the back of the grid for both races, after having not set a time within the 107% limit during qualifying.

Race 1

Race 2

Standings after the event

Drivers' Championship standings

Model of the Year standings

Teams' Championship standings

 Note: Only the top five positions are included for both sets of drivers' standings.

References

External links
TCR International Series official website

Buriram
TCR International Series
TCR